Pacucha District is one of the nineteen districts of the province Andahuaylas in Peru.

Ethnic groups 
The people in the district are mainly indigenous citizens of Quechua descent. Quechua is the language which the majority of the population (91.50%) learnt to speak in childhood, 8.15% of the residents started speaking using the Spanish language (2007 Peru Census).

See also 
 Sóndor – an archeological site in Pacucha District

References

Districts of the Andahuaylas Province
Districts of the Apurímac Region